Berlandina is a genus of ground spiders that was first described by R. de Dalmas in 1922.

Species
 it contains thirty-eight species:
Berlandina afghana Denis, 1958 – Iran, Afghanistan, Pakistan
Berlandina apscheronica Dunin, 1984 – Russia (Europe), Azerbaijan, Kazakhstan
Berlandina asbenica Denis, 1955 – Niger
Berlandina avishur Levy, 2009 – Israel
Berlandina caspica Ponomarev, 1979 – Russia (Europe to Central Asia), Caucasus, Iran, Central Asia, Mongolia
Berlandina charitonovi Ponomarev, 1979 – Russia (Europe, Caucasus), Azerbaijan, Kazakhstan
Berlandina cinerea (Menge, 1872) – Europe, Russia (Europe to South Siberia), Iran, Kazakhstan
Berlandina corcyraea (O. Pickard-Cambridge, 1874) – Albania, Greece (incl. Corfu)
Berlandina denisi Roewer, 1961 – Afghanistan
Berlandina deserticola (Dalmas, 1921) – Algeria, Libya
Berlandina drassodea (Caporiacco, 1934) – Karakorum
Berlandina hui Song, Zhu & Zhang, 2004 – China
Berlandina kolosvaryi Caporiacco, 1947 – East Africa
Berlandina koponeni Marusik, Fomichev & Omelko, 2014 – Mongolia, China
Berlandina litvinovi Fomichev & Marusik, 2017 – Mongolia
Berlandina meruana (Dalmas, 1921) – East Africa
Berlandina mishenini Marusik, Fomichev & Omelko, 2014 – Mongolia
Berlandina nabozhenkoi Ponomarev & Tsvetkov, 2006 – Russia (Europe)
Berlandina nakonechnyi Marusik, Fomichev & Omelko, 2014 – Mongolia
Berlandina nenilini Ponomarev & Tsvetkov, 2006 – Kazakhstan
Berlandina nigromaculata (Blackwall, 1865) – Cape Verde Is.
Berlandina nubivaga (Simon, 1878) – Alps (France, Italy, Switzerland), Macedonia, Bulgaria
Berlandina obscurata Caporiacco, 1947 – East Africa
Berlandina ovtsharenkoi Marusik, Fomichev & Omelko, 2014 – Mongolia
Berlandina piephoi Schmidt, 1994 – Cape Verde Is.
Berlandina plumalis (O. Pickard-Cambridge, 1872) (type) – West Africa, Mediterranean to Central Asia, Iran
Berlandina potanini Schenkel, 1963 – Russia (South Siberia), Mongolia, China
Berlandina propinqua Roewer, 1961 – Afghanistan
Berlandina pulchra (Nosek, 1905) – Turkey
Berlandina punica (Dalmas, 1921) – Algeria, Tunisia, Libya
Berlandina saraevi Ponomarev, 2008 – Kazakhstan
Berlandina schenkeli Marusik & Logunov, 1995 – Russia (South Siberia)
Berlandina shnitnikovi (Spassky, 1934) – Kazakhstan
Berlandina shumskyi Kovblyuk, 2003 – Ukraine
Berlandina spasskyi Ponomarev, 1979 – Russia (Europe), Kazakhstan, Mongolia, China
Berlandina ubsunurica Marusik & Logunov, 1995 – Russia (South Siberia), Mongolia
Berlandina venatrix (O. Pickard-Cambridge, 1874) – Libya, Egypt
Berlandina yakovlevi Marusik, Fomichev & Omelko, 2014 – Mongolia

References

Araneomorphae genera
Gnaphosidae